Cornwood is a village and civil parish in the South Hams in Devon, England. The parish has a population of 988. The village is part of the electoral ward called Cornwood and Sparkwell. The ward population at the 2011 census was 2,321.

Blachford House is a large grade II* listed country house standing in parkland on the northwest edge of the village. It is currently owned by Alexander Darwall, a multimillionaire hedge fund manager who became notorious for bringing about a ban on the long-practised custom of wild camping on Dartmoor, in response to which 3,000 protesters gathered in Cornwood to march onto nearby Stall Moor on 21 January 2023. Darwall’s actions earned him the epithet ‘the most hated landowner’. From 1852 to 1959 the village was served by Cornwood railway station on the South Devon Main Line between Exeter and Plymouth.

The civil parish includes the villages and hamlets of Lutton, Yondertown, North Hele, South Hele, Corntown, Uppaton, Tor, East Rook and West Rook.

Religion 

The Church of St Michael's is Cornwood's parish church.

It was from Cornwood vicarage, in 1785, that Reverend Thomas Vivian wrote Revelation explained, a pioneering attempt by the Established Church to write about the Book of Revelation for a general audience. Thomas Vivian believed his subject matter fell naturally into three sections; the first dealt with verifiable historical events, the second dealt with contemporary and continuing events that characterised a church that had departed from "the Simplicity of the Gospel" and, finally, prophecies for the future.  The book was dedicated to the Bishop of Exeter, published in Plymouth and distributed from London, Bath and Exeter.

References 

Villages in South Hams
Civil parishes in South Hams